Oxendon may refer to:

Great Oxendon and Little Oxendon, villages in Northamptonshire, England
Oxendon Rural District, a former rural district
Oxendon Tunnels, disused railway tunnels
Clipston and Oxendon railway station

See also
 Oxenden (disambiguation)